is a type of audience hall in Japanese architecture that was developed during the Muromachi period. The term originally meant a study and a place for lectures on the sūtra within a temple, but later it came to mean just a drawing room or study. From this room takes its name the shoin-zukuri style. In a shoin-zukuri building, the shoin is the zashiki, a tatami-room dedicated to the reception of guests.

The emerging architecture of the Muromachi period was subsequently influenced by the increasing use and appearance of shoin. One of the most noticeable changes in architecture to arise from the shoin came from the practice of lining their floors with tatami mats. Since tatami mats have a standardized size the floor plans for shoin rooms had to be developed around the proportions of the tatami mat; this in turn affected the proportions of doors, the height of rooms, and other aspects of the structure. Before the shoin popularized the practice of lining floors with tatami mats it had been standard to only bring out a single tatami mat for the highest-ranking person in the room to sit on.

The architecture surrounding and influenced by the shoin quickly developed many other distinguishing features. Since the guests sat on the floor instead of on furniture, they were positioned at a lower vantage point than their Chinese counterparts who were accustomed to using furniture. This lower vantage point generated such developments as the suspended ceilings which functioned to make the room feel less expansive, and also resulted in the ceilings rafters being no longer visible as they were in China. The new suspended ceilings also allowed for more elaborate decoration, resulting in many highly ornate suspended ceilings in addition to the much simpler ones. Another characteristic development to arise from the lower vantage point were the tokonoma and chigaidana. The tokonoma was an elevated recess built into the wall to create a space for displaying the Chinese art which was popular at the time at a comfortable eye level. The chigaidana, or "staggered shelves", were shelving structures built into the tokonoma to display smaller objects. Occurring at the same time as the development of the shoin architecture, the fusuma, or "sliding doors", were becoming a popular means to divide rooms. As a result, columns began to be created that were square-shaped to accommodate the sliding doors.

The asymmetry of the tokonoma and chigaidana pair, as well as the squared pillars differentiated the shoin design with the Chinese design at the time which preferred symmetric pairs of furniture and round pillars. Soon after its advent shoin architecture became associated with these evolving elements as it became the predominant format for formal gathering rooms.

References 

Japanese architectural features
Rooms